Francesco Paolo Di Blasi (Palermo, 1753 or 1755 – Palermo, 20 May 1795) was a Sicilian jurist, revolutionary and writer, known as an important advocate of the Sicilian nationalism.

Nephew of the Benedictine abbots Salvatore Maria and Giovanni Evangelista, Francesco Paolo Di Blasi was a lawyer influenced by Illuminism. In 1790 he was involved in the foundation of the Accademia Siciliana, an institution devoted to the protection of the Sicilian language. Fascinated by the French Revolution, in 1795 Di Blasi was arrested and tried. Charged with republican conspiracy, he was executed by decapitation in Palermo, at the "Piano di Santa Teresa" (current Piazza Indipendenza), on 20 May 1795.

His matter is told by Leonardo Sciascia's novel The Council of Egypt (1963).

His character plays an important role in the historical novel Calvello the Bastard by Luigi Natoli.

Works 
 Dissertazione sopra l'egualità e ladisuguaglianza degli uomini in riguardo alla loro felicità (1778)
 Saggio sopra la legislazione di Sicilia (1790)
 Pragmaticae sanctiones Regni Siciliae, quas iussu Ferdinandi III Borbonii nunc primum ad fidem authenticorum exemplarium in regiis tabulariis existentium recensuit Fr. Paulusde Blasi (1791–93)

External links 
 DI BLASI, Francesco Paolo, Dizionario Biografico degli Italiani 

Sicilian nationalists
Writers from Sicily
Jurists from Palermo
Writers from Palermo
People executed by the Kingdom of Sicily
1753 births
1795 deaths
18th-century jurists
18th-century Italian jurists
People executed by decapitation